A list of books and essays about John Ford:

Ford